Lukáš Bohunický (born October 30, 1987) is a Slovak professional ice hockey defenceman. He is currently playing for HK Dukla Trenčín of the Slovak Extraliga.

Bohunický has played professionally for HC Slovan Bratislava in the Slovak Extraliga and HK Ruzinov 99 Bratislava in Slovak 2.Liga. He spent his Junior Hockey career playing two seasons for the Kootenay Ice of the Canadian Western Hockey League. He has also played on the Slovakia men's national under-18 ice hockey team in the IIHF World U18 Championship and Slovakia's national under-17 ice hockey team in the World Under-17 Hockey Challenge.

On February 8, 2012, he was signed by the Missouri Mavericks of the Central Hockey League for the remainder of their 2011-12 season.

On October 19, 2012, he signed with BK Mladá Boleslav.

Career statistics

References

External links

1987 births
Bratislava Capitals players
BK Mladá Boleslav players
Edinburgh Capitals players
HC Slovan Bratislava players
HK Dukla Trenčín players
Kootenay Ice players
Living people
Missouri Mavericks players
Motor České Budějovice players
Slovak ice hockey defencemen
Ice hockey people from Bratislava
Slovak expatriate sportspeople in Scotland
Expatriate ice hockey players in Scotland
Slovak expatriate ice hockey players in the United States
Slovak expatriate ice hockey players in Canada